Ioannis Nake (born 6 October 1990) is a Greece international rugby league footballer who plays for the Attica Rhinos.

Playing career
In 2022, Nake was named in the Greece squad for the 2021 Rugby League World Cup, the first ever Greek Rugby League squad to compete in a World Cup.

References

External links
Greece profile
Greek profile

1990 births
Living people
Rugby league hookers
Greek rugby league players
Greece national rugby league team players
People from Devoll (municipality)